WrestleMania is the annual flagship professional wrestling pay-per-view event of WWE, the world's largest professional wrestling promotion

WrestleMania may also refer to:
 WrestleMania I (1985) – the original "WrestleMania", chronologically known as "WrestleMania I"

In video games:
 WWF WrestleMania (1989 video game)
 WWF WrestleMania (1991 video game)
 WWF WrestleMania: The Arcade Game

In music:
WrestleMania: The Album

In television:
 "WrestleMania", an episode of Hogan Knows Best
 WrestleMania Backlash, the altered title of WWE's Backlash event in 2021 and 2022